The Italy men's national squash team represents Italy in international squash team competitions, and is governed by Italian Squash Federation.

Since 1989, Italy has participated in two quarter finals of the World Squash Team Open.

Current team
 Davide Bianchetti
 Amr Swelim
 Marcus Berrett
 Jose Facchini

Results

World Team Squash Championships

European Squash Team Championships

See also 
 Italian Squash Federation
 World Team Squash Championships
 Italy women's national squash team

References 

Squash teams
Men's national squash teams
Squash
Squash in Italy